Adi Mehremić (born 26 April 1992) is a Bosnian professional footballer who plays as a centre-back for Süper Lig club İstanbulspor.

Club career
Mehremić started his career playing with Radnik Hadžići, Velež Mostar and Olimpik.    

On 27 September 2013, he signed a half-year contract with option to buy with Slovak club Ružomberok.

In March 2014, Mehremić joined Latvian Higher League club Spartaks Jūrmala on a one-year contract.

In January 2015, he signed a one-year deal with Czech National Football League club Frýdek-Místek. After Frýdek-Místek, Mehremić played for Senica, Spartak Myjava, St. Pölten and Željezničar with whom he won the 2017–18 Bosnian cup.

In July 2018, he joined Ukrainian Premier League club Karpaty Lviv. After one season at Karpaty, Mehremić left the club and shortly after, on 6 July 2019, signed a three-year contract with Portuguese Primeira Liga club Aves. He made his official debut for Aves on 11 August 2019, in a 1–0 away league loss against Boavista.

Honours
Željezničar
Bosnian Cup: 2017–18

References

External links

Adi Mehremić profile at Sofascore

1992 births
Living people
Footballers from Sarajevo
Bosnia and Herzegovina footballers
Association football fullbacks
FK Radnik Hadžići players
FK Velež Mostar players
FK Olimpik players
MFK Ružomberok players
FK Spartaks Jūrmala players
FK Frýdek-Místek players
FK Senica players
Spartak Myjava players
SKN St. Pölten players
FK Željezničar Sarajevo players
FC Karpaty Lviv players
C.D. Aves players
Wisła Kraków players
Maccabi Petah Tikva F.C. players
İstanbulspor footballers
First League of the Federation of Bosnia and Herzegovina players
Premier League of Bosnia and Herzegovina players
Slovak Super Liga players
Latvian Higher League players
Czech National Football League players
Austrian Football Bundesliga players
Ukrainian Premier League players
Primeira Liga players
Ekstraklasa players
I liga players
Israeli Premier League players
Süper Lig players
Expatriate footballers in Slovakia
Bosnia and Herzegovina expatriate sportspeople in Slovakia
Expatriate footballers in Latvia
Bosnia and Herzegovina expatriate sportspeople in Latvia
Expatriate footballers in the Czech Republic
Bosnia and Herzegovina expatriate sportspeople in the Czech Republic
Expatriate footballers in Austria
Bosnia and Herzegovina expatriate sportspeople in Austria
Expatriate footballers in Ukraine
Bosnia and Herzegovina expatriate sportspeople in Ukraine
Expatriate footballers in Portugal
Bosnia and Herzegovina expatriate sportspeople in Portugal
Expatriate footballers in Poland
Bosnia and Herzegovina expatriate sportspeople in Poland
Expatriate footballers in Israel
Bosnia and Herzegovina expatriate sportspeople in Israel
Expatriate footballers in Turkey
Bosnia and Herzegovina expatriate sportspeople in Turkey